Rayososaurus is a genus of plant-eating sauropod dinosaur of the superfamily Diplodocoidea. It was found in the Candeleros Formation, but was named Rayososaurus after the Rayoso Member, which later has been elevated to the older Rayoso Formation. The formations are located in the Neuquén Basin of northern Patagonia, Argentina. Rayososaurus lived during the Cenomanian epoch of the Late Cretaceous, about 99 to 96 million years ago.  The type species is R. agrioensis, named by Argentinian paleontologist José Bonaparte in 1996. The species epithet agrioensis refers to the Agrio del Medio locality.

Description 
Rayososaurus is extremely similar to Rebbachisaurus and there is some debate as to whether Rayososaurus is indeed a separate genus. However, morphological and temporal differences tend to support the distinction. Fossil finds include the holotype, MACN-N 41, a scapula, femur and part of fibula, and the paratype (Rayososaurus sp.), one broken dorsal vertebra and four broken caudal vertebrae. The racket-shaped scapula is characteristic of the Rebbachisauridae.

Phylogeny

References 

Rebbachisaurids
Cenomanian life
Late Cretaceous dinosaurs of South America
Cretaceous Argentina
Fossils of Argentina
Candeleros Formation
Fossil taxa described in 1996
Taxa named by José Bonaparte